Alcampell or El Campell is a municipality located in La Litera/La Llitera, province of Huesca, Aragon, Spain. According to the 2004 census (INE), the municipality has a population of 849 inhabitants.

References

Municipalities in the Province of Huesca